Norbert Tóth (born 11 August 1976) is a Hungarian football player who is currently playing for TJ OFC Gabčíkovo.

Honours  
Nemzeti Bajnokság I:  Winner: 1998 
Magyar Kupa:  Runner-up: 1993, 1998 
Hungarian Second Division:  Winner: 2008

External links 
 
 HLSZ

1976 births
Living people
Sportspeople from Szombathely
Hungarian footballers
Association football midfielders
Hungary international footballers
Szombathelyi Haladás footballers
Fehérvár FC players
Újpest FC players
Vasas SC players
Hungarian expatriate footballers
Expatriate footballers in Greece
Panionios F.C. players
Hungarian expatriate sportspeople in Greece
Rákospalotai EAC footballers
Zalaegerszegi TE players
Lombard-Pápa TFC footballers